Ctenoberta is a genus of moths in the family Geometridae.

Species
 Ctenoberta abanga Prout, 1915

References
 Ctenoberta at Markku Savela's Lepidoptera and Some Other Life Forms
 Natural History Museum Lepidoptera genus database

Geometrinae